Professor Graham Moore is a British scientist, an internationally recognised researcher and Director of the John Innes Centre, Norwich. Most of his research has focused on understanding cereal genetics.

Professor Moore developed the pioneering concept of cereal ‘Synteny’, for which he was awarded the Royal Society Darwin Medal in 1998. His research provides an understanding of the control of pairing and crossover between related chromosomes in wheat and enables genes from wild relatives to be incorporated into the wheat genome.

His research aims to understand the genes involved in the temperature sensitivity of meiosis. In 2021 Professor Moore's research group characterised the gene, ZIP4, which has profound effects on the production of seeds in wheat. Professor Moore’s group took advantage of new wheat research technology to explain genetic elements.

He is internationally recognised for his work, and in 2018 he was jointly awarded the Rank Prize for Nutrition  for his contribution to pioneering research which enabled plant breeders to exploit genomics to develop improved wheat cultivars.

Since 2007 he has coordinated the BBSRC-funded cross-institutional wheat programme, Designing Future Wheat, involving eight UK institutions.

Awards 

 1998 − The Royal Society Darwin Medal, jointly with Professor Michael Denis Gale.
 2018 − Rank Prize for Nutrition, jointly with Professor Keith Edwards.

Works 

 Cereal genome evolution: grasses, line up and form a circle. Graham Moore, KM Devos, Z Wang, MD Gale, 1995/7/1.

References 

British geneticists
Living people
1958 births